Cobalt(II) cyanide is  the inorganic compound with the formula Co(CN)2.  It is coordination polymer that has attracted intermittent attention over many years in the area of inorganic synthesis and homogeneous catalysis.

Uses
Cobalt(II) cyanide has been used as a precursor to dicobalt octacarbonyl.

Preparation and structure
The trihydrate salt is obtained as a reddish-brown precipitate by adding two equivalents of potassium cyanide to a cobalt salt solution:
CoCl2(H2O)6 + 2 KCN → Co(CN)2 + 2 KCl  +  6 H2O
With excess cyanide, the red brown dicyanide dissolves to give pentacyanocobaltate.

Solid  cobalt(II) cyanide is a coordination polymer consisting of cobalt ions linked by cyanide units in a cubic arrangement, each such cobalt atom having octahedral geometry, and an additional cobalt atom in half of the cubic cavities. That is, the structure is actually Co[Co(CN)3]2 in a zeolite-like structure. It forms hydrates and other inclusion complexes by having substances diffuse into the cavities that do not contain the cobalt atoms.

References

Cobalt(II) compounds
Cyanides